Chen Qinggang (born June 1966) is a Chinese journalist who served as the bureau chief of Hangzhou Daily News. He took many photographs mainly about people's livelihood.

Biography
Chen was born in Lianyungang, Jiangsu province in 1966.

Education
He graduated from Nanjing University of Arts and worked for several newspapers.

Representative works
“Investigation on situation of poor families in China in the late 20th century",  "Investigation on bacteriological warfare". He won the International press photography competition gold medal in 2005 by the work "The Survived Comfort Women in China". And also won the medal in 2007 by the work "Gray space – depression".

Greatest credit
He won the Lotus racing award in 2010 by "14 : China farmers' survival report". He lived with poor farmers in northwestern China to record their lives and took photos of them. He finally wrote a book which accurately reflects farmer's poor lives. The book has become one of the most popular books in 2011.

References

People's Republic of China journalists
1966 births
Chinese photojournalists
Writers from Lianyungang
Living people